Guillermo Martínez is the name of:

 Guillermo Martínez (baseball) (born 1984), American baseball coach
 Guillermo Martínez (footballer), Mexican Soccer player
 Guillermo Martínez (javelin thrower) (born 1981), Cuban javelin thrower
 Guillermo Martínez (sport shooter) (born 1930), Colombian sport shooter
 Guillermo Martínez (volleyball) (born 1969), Argentine volleyball player
 Guillermo Martínez (writer) (born 1962), Argentine novelist and short story writer
 Guillermo Martínez Casañ (born 1955), Spanish politician
 Guillermo Ortiz Martínez (born 1948), Mexican economist and politician
 Guillermo Zúñiga Martínez (1942–2015), Mexican politician